The 1954 Lafayette Leopards baseball team represented Lafayette College in the 1954 NCAA baseball season. The Leopards played their home games at Fisher Field. The team was coached by Charlie Gelbert in his 9th year at Lafayette.

The Leopards won the District II Playoff to advanced to the College World Series, where they were defeated by the Oklahoma A&M Cowboys.

Roster

Schedule 

! style="" | Regular Season
|- valign="top" 

|- align="center" bgcolor="#ccffcc"
| 1 || April 3 ||  || Fisher Field • Easton, Pennsylvania || 5–0 || 1–0
|- align="center" bgcolor="#ffcccc"
| 2 || April 7 ||  || Fisher Field • Easton, Pennsylvania || 1–7 || 1–1
|- align="center" bgcolor="#ccffcc"
| 3 || April 8 ||  || Fisher Field • Easton, Pennsylvania || 9–2 || 2–1
|- align="center" bgcolor="#ccffcc"
| 4 || April 10 || at  || Unknown • Annapolis, Maryland || 10–4 || 3–1
|- align="center" bgcolor="#ccffcc"
| 5 || April 13 ||  || Fisher Field • Easton, Pennsylvania || 6–3 || 4–1
|- align="center" bgcolor="#ccffcc"
| 6 || April 15 || at  || Unknown • Newark, Delaware || 4–0 || 5–1
|- align="center" bgcolor="#ccffcc"
| 7 || April 19 || at  || Unknown • Scranton, Pennsylvania || 19–6 || 6–1
|- align="center" bgcolor="#ffcccc"
| 8 || April 20 || at  || Unknown • New York, New York || 6–7 || 6–2
|- align="center" bgcolor="#ffcccc"
| 9 || April 21 || at  || Doubleday Field • West Point, New York || 2–3 || 6–3
|- align="center" bgcolor="#ccffcc"
| 10 || April 24 || at  || New Beaver Field • University Park, Pennsylvania || 5–2 || 7–3
|- align="center" bgcolor="#ccffcc"
| 11 || April 27 ||  || Fisher Field • Easton, Pennsylvania || 12–0 || 8–3
|-

|- align="center" bgcolor="#ccffcc"
| 12 || May 1 ||  || Fisher Field • Easton, Pennsylvania || 9–1 || 9–3
|- align="center" bgcolor="#ffcccc"
| 13 || May 4 ||  || Fisher Field • Easton, Pennsylvania || 1–2 || 9–4
|- align="center" bgcolor="#ffcccc"
| 14 || May 6 || at  || Unknown • Allentown, Pennsylvania || 2–3 || 9–5
|- align="center" bgcolor="#ccffcc"
| 15 || May 12 || at  || Unknown • Swarthmore, Pennsylvania || 13–4 || 10–5
|- align="center" bgcolor="#ccffcc"
| 16 || May 15 ||  || Fisher Field • Easton, Pennsylvania || 5–0 || 11–5
|- align="center" bgcolor="#ffcccc"
| 17 || May 19 || vs  || Unknown • Unknown || 4–5 || 11–6
|- align="center" bgcolor="#ccffcc"
| 18 || May 22 || at Rutgers || Bainton Field • Piscataway, New Jersey || 6–4 || 12–6
|- align="center" bgcolor="#ccffcc"
| 19 || May 25 ||  || Fisher Field • Easton, Pennsylvania || 6–1 || 13–6
|- align="center" bgcolor="#ccffcc"
| 20 || May 29 ||  || Fisher Field • Easton, Pennsylvania || 10–2 || 14–6
|-

|-
|-
! style="" | Postseason
|- valign="top"

|- align="center" bgcolor="#ccffcc"
| 21 || June 4 || vs  || Breadon Field • Allentown, Pennsylvania || 4–3 || 15–6
|- align="center" bgcolor="#ccffcc"
| 22 || June 5 || vs  || Breadon Field • Allentown, Pennsylvania || 9–0 || 16–6
|-

|- align="center" bgcolor="#ffcccc"
| 23 || June 10 || vs Missouri || Omaha Municipal Stadium • Omaha, Nebraska || 3–5 || 16–7
|- align="center" bgcolor="#ffcccc"
| 24 || June 11 || vs  || Omaha Municipal Stadium • Omaha, Nebraska || 2–4 || 16–8
|-

|-
|

References 

Lafayette Leopards baseball seasons
Lafayette Leopards baseball
College World Series seasons
Lafayette Leopards